Chrysops pikei is a species of deer fly in the family Tabanidae.

Distribution
Canada, United States.

References

Tabanidae
Insects described in 1904
Diptera of North America